Frances Caroline Cramp (born 27 June 1947) is a female former diver who competed for Great Britain and England.

Diving career
She represented Great Britain in the 10 metres platform event at the 1964 Summer Olympics.

Two years later she was selected for England in the 10 metres platform event, at the 1966 British Empire and Commonwealth Games in Kingston, Jamaica.

References

External links 
 

1947 births
Living people
English female divers
Olympic divers of Great Britain
Divers at the 1964 Summer Olympics
Divers at the 1966 British Empire and Commonwealth Games
Commonwealth Games competitors for England